The 2022 Wimbledon Championships's order of play for main draw matches on the center court and outside courts, starting from June 27 until July 10.

All dates are BST (UTC+1).

Day 1 (27 June) 
Seeds out:
 Gentlemen's Singles:  Hubert Hurkacz [7],  Pablo Carreño Busta [16]
 Ladies' Singles:  Danielle Collins [7],  Martina Trevisan [22],  Beatriz Haddad Maia [23],  Kaia Kanepi [31]
Schedule of play

Day 2 (28 June) 
Seeds out:
 Gentlemen's Singles:  Félix Auger-Aliassime [6],  Grigor Dimitrov [18],  Holger Rune [24],  Dan Evans [28]
 Ladies' Singles:  Belinda Bencic [14],  Jil Teichmann [18],  Camila Giorgi [21],  Yulia Putintseva [27],  Shelby Rogers [30]
Schedule of play

Day 3 (29 June) 
Rain disrupted play for an hour and started at 12:45 pm local time, the roofs at two main courts were already closed.
Seeds out:
 Gentlemen's Singles:  Casper Ruud [3],  Reilly Opelka [15],  Sebastián Báez [31]
 Ladies' Singles:  Anett Kontaveit [2],  Garbiñe Muguruza [9],  Emma Raducanu [10],  Sorana Cîrstea [26],  Anhelina Kalinina [29]
 Gentlemen's Doubles:  Marcelo Arévalo /  Jean-Julien Rojer [4]
 Ladies' Doubles:  Lucie Hradecká /  Sania Mirza [6],  Monica Niculescu /  Elena-Gabriela Ruse [14]
Schedule of play

Day 4 (30 June) 
Seeds out:
 Gentlemen's Singles:  Diego Schwartzman [12],  Denis Shapovalov [13],  Roberto Bautista Agut [17] (withdrew),  Filip Krajinović [26]
 Ladies' Singles:  Karolína Plíšková [6],  Sara Sorribes Tormo [32]
 Gentlemen's Doubles:  Tim Pütz /  Michael Venus [5]
 Ladies' Doubles:  Latisha Chan /  Samantha Stosur [12]
Schedule of play

Day 5 (1 July) 
Seeds out:
 Gentlemen's Singles:  John Isner [20],  Nikoloz Basilashvili [22],  Miomir Kecmanović [25],  Oscar Otte [32]
 Ladies' Singles:  Maria Sakkari [5],  Angelique Kerber [15],  Alison Riske-Amritraj [28],  Zhang Shuai [33]
 Mixed Doubles:  Marcelo Arévalo /  Giuliana Olmos [5]
Schedule of play

Day 6 (2 July) 
Seeds out:
 Gentlemen's Singles:  Stefanos Tsitsipas [4],  Lorenzo Sonego [27],  Jenson Brooksby [29]
 Ladies' Singles:  Iga Świątek [1],  Jessica Pegula [8],  Coco Gauff [11],  Barbora Krejčíková [13],  Petra Kvitová [25]
 Ladies' Doubles:  Natela Dzalamidze /  Aleksandra Krunić [13],  Marie Bouzková /  Tereza Mihalíková [16]
Schedule of play

Day 7 (3 July) 
This day was previously called Middle Sunday, as for the first time in the tournament's history there would be a regular Middle Sunday match to prevent from weather delays in the past.

Seeds out:
 Gentlemen's Singles:  Carlos Alcaraz [5],  Frances Tiafoe [23],  Tommy Paul [30]
 Ladies' Singles:  Jeļena Ostapenko [12],  Elise Mertens [24]
 Gentlemen's Doubles:  Lloyd Glasspool /  Harri Heliövaara [15],  Rafael Matos /  David Vega Hernández [16]
 Ladies' Doubles:  Gabriela Dabrowski /  Giuliana Olmos [3]
 Mixed Doubles:  Nicolas Mahut /  Zhang Shuai [3],  Filip Polášek /  Andreja Klepač [8]
Schedule of play

Day 8 (4 July) 
Seeds out:
 Gentlemen's Singles:  Alex de Minaur [19],  Botic van de Zandschulp [21]
 Ladies' Singles:  Paula Badosa [4]
 Gentlemen's Doubles:  Wesley Koolhof /  Neal Skupski [3],  Jamie Murray /  Bruno Soares [9],  Santiago González /  Andrés Molteni [13]
 Ladies' Doubles:  Asia Muhammad /  Ena Shibahara [5],  Xu Yifan /  Yang Zhaoxuan [9],  Nadiia Kichenok /  Raluca Olaru [15]
 Mixed Doubles:  Jean-Julien Rojer /  Ena Shibahara [1],  John Peers /  Gabriela Dabrowski [4]
Schedule of play

Day 9 (5 July) 
Seeds out:
 Gentlemen's Singles:  Jannik Sinner [10]
 Gentlemen's Doubles:  Kevin Krawietz /  Andreas Mies [11]
 Ladies' Doubles:  Shuko Aoyama /  Chan Hao-ching [8],  Nicole Melichar-Martinez /  Ellen Perez [10]
 Mixed Doubles:  Robert Farah /  Jeļena Ostapenko [7]
Schedule of play

Day 10 (6 July) 
Seeds out:
 Gentlemen's Singles:  Taylor Fritz [11]
 Ladies' Singles:  Amanda Anisimova [20]
 Gentlemen's Doubles:  John Peers /  Filip Polášek [7],  Nicolas Mahut /  Édouard Roger-Vasselin [12]
 Ladies' Doubles:  Andreja Klepač /  Alexa Guarachi [7],  Erin Routliffe /  Alicja Rosolska [11]
 Mixed Doubles:  Sania Mirza /  Mate Pavić [6]
Schedule of play

Day 11 (7 July) 
Seeds out:
 Gentlemen's Singles:  Rafael Nadal [2]
 Ladies' Singles:  Simona Halep [16]
 Gentlemen's Doubles:  Rajeev Ram /  Joe Salisbury [1],  Juan Sebastián Cabal /  Robert Farah [6]
Schedule of play

Day 12 (8 July) 
Seeds out:
 Gentlemen's Singles:  Cameron Norrie [9]
 Ladies' Doubles:  Lyudmyla Kichenok /  Jeļena Ostapenko [4]
Schedule of play

Day 13 (9 July) 
Seeds out:
 Ladies' Singles:  Ons Jabeur [3]
 Gentlemen's Doubles:  Nikola Mektić /  Mate Pavić [2]
Schedule of play

Day 14 (10 July) 
Seeds out:
 Ladies' Doubles:  Elise Mertens /  Zhang Shuai [1]
Schedule of play

References

2022 Wimbledon Championships
Wimbledon Championships by year – Day-by-day summaries